Prostate-specific transcript 1 (non-protein coding), also known as PCGEM1, is a long non-coding RNA gene. In humans, it is located on chromosome 2q32. It is over-expressed in prostate cancer. In a study of prostate tumours from 88 men, levels of PCGEM1 were found to be higher in prostate cancer cells in African-American men than in Caucasian-American men. The mortality rate of prostate cancer is highest in African-American men.

PCGEM1 inhibits doxorubicin-induced apoptosis of cells, via delayed induction of p53 and p21.

See also
 Long noncoding RNA
 Prostate cancer

References

Further reading

External links
 

Non-coding RNA